Patrick Mooney may refer to:

Patrick Mooney (Australian politician) (1880–1942), Australian Lang Labor politician from New South Wales
Patrick Mooney (Irish politician) (1903–1989), Irish Fianna Fáil politician represented Monaghan from 1957–69
Pat Roy Mooney (born 1947), executive director